The Ottawa French Seventh-day Adventist Church is a francophone Seventh-day Adventist church in Ottawa, Ontario, Canada. It is located on King Edward Avenue, just north of Rideau Street.

History
The building was originally constructed in 1904 as a synagogue for the Adath Jeshurun congregation. The second synagogue in Ottawa, the building was designed by noted architect John W.H. Watts. In 1957, Adath Jeshurun and the Agudath Achim congregation merged to form the Beth Shalom congregation. The new group moved to a new synagogue at the corner of Rideau and Chapel Street. The synagogue became a memorial chapel and the funerals of many Ottawa notables were held there. In 1999, the building was sold to the Seventh-day Adventist Church.

References

Churches in Ottawa
Seventh-day Adventist churches in Canada
Former synagogues
Franco-Ontarian organizations